Thiodiodes is a genus of moths belonging to the subfamily Olethreutinae of the family Tortricidae.

Species
Thiodiodes seeboldi (Rossler, 1877)

See also
List of Tortricidae genera

References

External links
tortricidae.com

Tortricidae genera
Olethreutinae